Erastrifacies is a monotypic moth genus of the family Noctuidae. Its only species, Erastrifacies schedocala, is known from Mexico. Both the genus and the species were first described by Harrison Gray Dyar Jr. in 1925.

References

Herminiinae
Monotypic moth genera